Heterozerconidae is a small family of mites in the order Mesostigmata.

Species
Heterozerconidae contains eight genera, with 14 recognized species:
Genus Afroheterozercon Fain, 1989
Afroheterozercon spirostreptus (Fain, 1988)
Afroheterozercon cautus (Berlese, 1924)
Afroheterozercon pachybolus (Fain, 1988)
Afroheterozercon ancoratus Fain, 1989
Afroheterozercon mahsbergi Klompen, Amin & Gerdeman, 2013
Afroheterozercon sanghae Klompen, Amin & Gerdeman, 2013
Afroheterozercon gabonensis Klompen, Amin & Gerdeman, 2013
Afroheterozercon goodmani Klompen, Amin & Gerdeman, 2013
Afroheterozercon tanzaniensis Klompen, Amin & Gerdeman, 2013
Afroheterozercon madagascariensis Klompen, Amin & Gerdeman, 2013
Genus Allozercon Vitzthum, 1926
Allozercon audax (Berlese, 1910)
Allozercon fecundissimus Vitzthum, 1926
Genus Amheterozercon Fain, 1989
Amheterozercon oudemansi (Finnegan, 1931)
Genus Atacoseius Berlese, 1905
Atacoseius pellucens Berlese, 1905
Genus Heterozercon Berlese, 1888
Heterozercon degeneratus Berlese, 1888
Heterozercon microsuctus Fain, 1989
Heterozercon spirostreptus Fain, 1988
Genus Maracazercon Fain, 1989
Maracazercon joliveti Fain, 1989
Genus Philippinozercon Gerdeman, Garcia, Herczak & Klompen, 2018
Philippinozercon makilingensis Gerdeman, Garcia, Herczak & Klompen, 2018
Genus Zeterohercon C. H. W. Flechtmann & D. E. Johnston, 1990
Zeterohercon amphisbaenae C. H. W. Flechtmann & D. E. Johnston, 1990
Zeterohercon elegans (Lizaso, 1981)
Zeterohercon oudemansi (Finnegan, 1931)

References

Mesostigmata
Acari families

pt:Heterozerconoidea